Thomas Stafford Broughton (10 August 1810 – 12 December 1901) was an Australian politician.

He was born in Windsor to Thomas Broughton and Mary Stafford. At the age of nine he became an apprentice tailor, owning his own business by the age of 23. In 1838 he married Jane Tindale, with whom he had fifteen children. By this time he was farming, with over 150,000 acres in the Lachlan River district, together with the Artarmon estate and a residence at Paddington. In 1842 he became a foundation alderman on Sydney City Council, serving until 1851 including a period as mayor in 1847. In 1859 he was elected to the New South Wales Legislative Assembly for West Sydney, but he was defeated in 1860. Broughton died at Glebe in 1901.

References

External links
  [CC-By-SA]  

1810 births
1901 deaths
Members of the New South Wales Legislative Assembly
Mayors and Lord Mayors of Sydney
19th-century Australian politicians